Harold Dozier, known by his pen name of Themo H. Peel is an American writer, poet, and graphic designer best known as the author and illustrator of the fantasy novel "Black Star", part of the children's book series Emersus Project. Themo has authored and illustrated a number of children's fantasy stories and poetry anthologies. He attended Yale University studying fine arts (graphic design) before completing an MA in meriting (poetry) at the University of Edinburgh. He currently lives and writes in Edinburgh, Scotland.

Career
Themo's first experience with writing children's literature was with the book Jack and Alice, which was written for friends to celebrate the birth of their children. He subsequently wrote and illustrated a sequel: Jack and Alice: Where Are The Cats?
 
As part of Themo's academic development, he wrote and illustrated his first children's book, Unexplained Phenomena (and Various Excuses Why) containing a variety of children's poems. The theme of his first anthology dealt with explanations for the bizarre occurrences in childhood. Shortly following this he illustrated a book, Kroll and Peel’s Illustrated Guide to Infectious Diseases for Young People who are Especially Curious. This was completed in partnership with David Kroll, MD; it was tongue-in-cheek guide for children about the world of diseases with illustrations of the various bacteria, viruses and parasites. 
 
His first young-adult novel, Black Star, was published in October 2013 and featured his own illustrations and designs. A percentage of the sales of the book were donated to Book Aid International, a charity that increases access to books and supports literacy, education and development in Sub-Saharan Africa. Themo's second novel, and second book in the Emersus Project series, Spirit Shear was published in March 2016.

External links
 The Illustrative Themo H. Peel
 Goodreads

Writers who illustrated their own writing
1982 births
Living people
People associated with Edinburgh
American writers of young adult literature
Alumni of the University of Edinburgh
21st-century American writers
Yale University alumni
African-American writers
21st-century African-American writers
21st-century pseudonymous writers
20th-century African-American people